Hellinsia paraochracealis is a moth of the family Pterophoridae. It is found in Brazil (Distrito Federal).

The wingspan is 24‑26 mm. Adults have broad, uniformly black wings with a purplish iridescence. Adults are on wing in July and August.

References

Moths described in 1992
paraochracealis
Moths of South America